Sirijap is an alluvial plain on the northern bank of Pangong Tso, which plays a role in the Sino-Indian border dispute in the Ladakh region.

India had established three posts in Sirijap prior to the Sino-Indian War in 1962. between April 1960 and October 1962. Chinese forces defeated these posts on 21 October 1962 after encountering fierce resistance.

After the war, a Line of Actual Control (LAC) has come into being, which in India's view, runs to the left of the Sirijap plain at a shore point called "Finger 8". China claims the LAC to be further west at "Finger 4". The area between the two fingers continues to be patrolled by the Indian border police.

In May 2013, it was report that China had constructed a metal-top road in the area leading up to Finger 4. The Indian army claims to have used the road to patrol the area.

See also
 List of locations in Aksai Chin

Notes

References

Areas occupied by China through the Sino-Indian War
Tibet
Pangong Lake
Borders of Ladakh